Agios Georgios Langoura (Greek: Άγιος Γεώργιος Λάγγουρα, meaning "Saint George of Langoura area") is a neighbourhood in the eastern part of Patras, Greece. The name comes from a nearby church and the rich family of Langoura, their house still survives into the present time. During the Ottoman rule it had all the consulates and the residents of the consulates. In the neighbourhood locates also the Pampeloponnisiako Stadium.

Streets
 Genisseos Street
 Kalavryton Street (partly residential)
 Patron-Klaous Road

Geography
The western and central portions are made up of residential area. The eastern and the outer portions are still made up of farmlands.

History
Farmlands dominated the area and were made up of fruits and vegetables including tomatoes, potatoes, cattle, olives and other crops until the 1970s. Its population used to work on agriculture. Housing developments did not arrive until the 1960s with six to eight story residential buildings. It extended into the western portion, the central portion in the 1970s and the eastern portion in the 1980s and the 1990s. Its street plan are mainly parallel, the divided street is to the south. Housing developments are steadily growing as it extends slowly to the east.

People
Langoura family
Andreas Londos

References
 The first version of the article is translated from the article at the Greek Wikipedia (Άγιος Γεώργιος Λάγγουρα)

Neighborhoods in Patras